Comoros competed at the 2020 Summer Olympics in Tokyo. Originally scheduled to take place from 24 July to 9 August 2020, the Games were postponed to 23 July to 8 August 2021, due to the COVID-19 pandemic. It was the nation's seventh consecutive appearance at the Summer Olympics.

Competitors
The following is the list of number of competitors in the Games.

Athletics

Comoros received the universality slots from the World Athletics to send two athletes (one male and one female) to the Olympics. Amed Elna, who studied law at Sorbonne University, Paris, was flag bearer for her nation in the opening ceremony. She competed in the 100 metres in which she finished eighth in the first preliminary heat running a time of 14.30, which was a new personal best.

Track & road events

Judo

Comoros received an invitation from the Tripartite Commission and the International Judo Federation to send Housni Thaobani in the men's half-middleweight category (81 kg) to the Olympics, marking the country's debut in the sport.

References

External links
 Comoros at the 2020 Summer Olympics at Olympedia

Olympics
2020
Nations at the 2020 Summer Olympics